The Pakua Plateau or Bagua Plateau, also known as the Pakua Mountain Range, is a plateau located in central-western Taiwan. It stretches across Changhua County and Nantou County. The plateau borders the Changhua Plain in the west and the Taichung Basin in the east. It is long and narrow, with a length of about 32 km and a width of about 4 to 7 km.

See also
Battle of Baguashan

References

Plateaus of Taiwan
Landforms of Changhua County
Landforms of Nantou County